Radmila Živković (born 14 January 1953) is a Serbian film, theater, television actress. She appeared in more than seventy films since 1969. In 1969 Živković 
didn't win the Miss Yugoslavia competition. It was a lady with the same first and family name.

Selected filmography

References

External links 

1953 births
Golden Arena winners
Living people
People from Kruševac
Serbian film actresses
Serbian stage actresses
Serbian voice actresses
Serbian television actresses
Serbian actresses
Žanka Stokić award winners